This list is of the Cultural Properties of Japan designated in the category of  for the Prefecture of Nara.

National Cultural Properties
As of 1 November 2015, forty-eight Important Cultural Properties (including seven *National Treasures) have been designated, being of national significance.

Prefectural Cultural Properties
As of 1 May 2015, fourteen properties have been designated at a prefectural level.

Municipal Cultural Properties
Properties designated at a municipal level include:

See also
 List of National Treasures of Japan (archaeological materials)
 Nara National Research Institute for Cultural Properties

References

External links
  Cultural Properties in Nara Prefecture

History of Nara Prefecture
Archaeological materials, Nara
Nara,Cultural Properties